UFC 124: St-Pierre vs. Koscheck 2 was a mixed martial arts pay-per-view event held by the Ultimate Fighting Championship on December 11, 2010 at Bell Centre in Montreal, Quebec, Canada. The event was the fourth that the UFC has hosted at the Bell Centre following UFC 83, UFC 97 and UFC 113 and the fifth event held in Canada along with UFC 115 which was held in Vancouver, British Columbia.

Background

A training injury forced Jason MacDonald out of his fight with Rafael Natal on October 20, 2010. He was replaced by UFC newcomer Jesse Bongfeldt.

On October 26, 2010, Anthony Waldburger had to pull out of his fight with Matthew Riddle due to an injury. He was replaced by Sean Pierson.

UFC 124 featured live preliminary bouts streamed on UFC.com rather than Spike TV due to the 2010 Spike Video Game Awards being aired in the same time slot.

UFC 124 marked the first – and only – time that the UFC let the fans vote online for the Fight of the Night. Dana White stated after that he would never do this again and said "The real fight of the night belonged to Matt Riddle and Sean Pierson".

Results

Bonus awards
Fighters were awarded $100,000 bonuses.

Fight of the Night: Georges St-Pierre vs. Josh Koscheck
Knockout of the Night: Mac Danzig
Submission of the Night: Mark Bocek and Jim Miller (split, $50,000 each)

References

See also
 Ultimate Fighting Championship
 List of UFC champions
 List of UFC events
 2010 in UFC

Ultimate Fighting Championship events
Mixed martial arts in Canada
Sports competitions in Montreal
2010 in mixed martial arts
2010 in Quebec